German (also Romanized as Garman; also known as Gorgān, Kūrqān, and Qurghān) is a village in Kharqan Rural District, Bastam District, Shahrud County, Semnan Province, Iran. At the 2006 census, its population was 335, in 102 families.

References 

Populated places in Shahrud County